Danielli may refer to:

People 
 Given name
 Danielli Yuri-Barbosa (born 1984), judoka from Brazil

 Surname
 Donatella Danielli (born 1966), professor of mathematics
 James Frederic Danielli FRS (1911–1984), English biologist
 Maurizio Danielli (born 1949), Italian rower
 Simon Danielli (born 1979), English retired rugby union player

Other uses 
 Danielli Furton, human rare genetic disorder formed by Macrosomia, Obesity, Macrocephaly and Ocular abnormalities
 Davson–Danielli model, a model of the plasma membrane of a cell, proposed in 1935 by Hugh Davson and James Danielli. 
 Equus quagga danielli,  a plains zebra that lived in South Africa until becoming extinct late in the 19th century
 Thaumatococcus daniellii, a plant species from Africa, known for being the natural source of thaumatin

See also 
 Daniel (disambiguation)
 Danieli (disambiguation)